Depok Baru Station (DPB) or commonly known as Margonda Station is a class I railway station in Pancoran Mas, Depok, West Java, Indonesia. The station, which is located +93m above sea level, only serves KRL Commuterline services.

The location of this station is very strategic, precisly behind the Depok Mayor's Office, ITC Depok, and the Margonda Depok Bus Terminal, which is opposite the Depok City Police Headquarters.

The inauguration date of the Depok Baru Station is still unknown, but it was reported that the station was renovated in 1992.

This is because the majority of KRL Commuterline passengers are used to using multi-trip cards and electronic money. In this way, long queues to buy KRL tickets can be cut.

Building and layout 
This station has three railway lines with lines 1 and 3 as a straight track. This station has access to the crossing via the top which is located in the middle of the platform, but is no longer used because access to the crossing is now via the pedestrian tunnel.

Services

Passenger services

KRL Commuterline

Supporting transportation

Incidents 

 On 29 April 2017, a female doctor was killed by a KRL train bound for Bogor. According to the testimonies of a number of witnesses, this incident was caused by the woman not heeding the KRL service officer's warning not to cross through the station emplacement. As a result, the KRL immediately crashed the female doctor.
 On 2 May 2022, there was a fire in the Pasar Kemiri Depok area, causing disruption to the Depok Baru-Bogor/Nambo KRL trips and the opposite direction because the electricity on the overhead power lines was cutted. The fire that occurred at 19.05 WIB was successfully extinguished by the Depok Fire Department and the overhead line could only be repaired at 21.03 WIB.

Gallery

References 

Railway stations in Indonesia